This article is a list of hereditary peers who are or have been members of the House of Lords by virtue of a life peerage under the Life Peerages Act 1958.

List of hereditary peers with life peerages

List of life peers who have disclaimed hereditary peerage

References

Notes

Citations 

Hereditary